First Flight High School is a public high school serving grades 9–12. The school was established in 2004, and is located in Kill Devil Hills, North Carolina on the Outer Banks of North Carolina.

The school opened to students on August 17, 2004, with 800 of them in attendance coming from nearby Manteo High School. It is part of the Dare County Schools school district.

Its boundary includes Kill Devil Hills, Kitty Hawk, Southern Shores, and Duck, as well as the unincorporated area of Colington Island.

Organization
The program of studies at First Flight High School offers approximately 170 courses within nine disciplines. Students may enroll in average and honors levels in most of the core subjects. The school changed in 2007–2008 to a hybrid schedule. In a hybrid schedule, students can take three yearlong classes and four semester block classes with the potential to earn seven credits annually.

Accreditation
 Southern Association of Colleges and Schools
 North Carolina Department of Public Instruction

Notable alumni 
 Alexis Knapp -- model, actress, and singer credited in movies Project X, Pitch Perfect, etc.. -- Class of 2007  
 Jordan Hennessey -- Republican delegate to NC Republican State Committee -- Class of 2013  
 Young Cutta -- producer from Kill Devil Hills, North Carolina credited collaborating with artists NBA Youngboy, Meek Mill, YBN Nahmir, Famous Dex, etc.. -- Class of 2022

References

Schools in Dare County, North Carolina
Public high schools in North Carolina
Educational institutions established in 2004
2004 establishments in North Carolina